Omicron acapulsece is a species of neotropical wasps that belongs to the genus Omicron and is found in South and Central America. It was discovered by Cameron in the year 1912. The species is diurnal. There is one subsepecies, Omicron acapulcense tenulum.

References 

Vespidae